Buzqov or Buzgov or Bizgov may refer to:
Asağı Buzqov, Azerbaijan
Yuxarı Buzqov, Azerbaijan